Maylandsea, and the adjacent Mayland, are villages on the Dengie Peninsula in the English county of Essex. They are part of the Althorne ward of the Maldon district, and have a
parish council that covers both villages.

Governance
Mayland is an electoral ward in the area involved. The total population at the 2011 Census was 4,360.

Religious sites

The local parish church is St Barnabas, which is in the Diocese of Chelmsford.

Local amenities
There are two public house/restaurants: "Blackwater Bar & Bistro" (purchased and refurbished by the present owners in late 2014)which is situated adjacent to the Blackwater Marina, and "Hardy's" (also recently refurbished). There are two sailing clubs enjoying the Blackwater River here: Maylandsea Bay Sailing Club, situated near to the boat yard & Bistro and the Harlow (Blackwater) Sailing Club, accessed via North Drive, Mayland.  The sea wall walk is enjoyed by locals and many visiting ramblers' groups.

The boatyard, originally Cardnells Boatyard, was involved in building motor torpedo boats (MTBs) in the Second World War.

The present local primary school is Maylandsea County Primary School, in Katonia Avenue.  It was built when increased development in Maylandsea and Lower Mayland made it impractical to transport the children to either Mayland & Althorne County Primary School, Southminster Road, Upper Mayland, or to Latchingdon C. of E. Primary school in the nearby village of Latchingdon.

Along Imperial Avenue, Maylandsea, there is a small shopping area serving the community; including (in 2017) a combined supermarket and Post Office; a bakery; general store; card shop; two hairdressers/barber's/beauty salon; dog grooming parlour; fish and chip shop; a second food outlet; pharmacy and a charity shop;.

On Steeple Road, Mayland, the award-winning Indian restaurant "Zara" can be found in the converted old farm workers' cottages near the junction of Steeple Road and Grange Avenue, Mayland.  Although the restaurant (previously a pub) has been known as "The Mayland Mill" for many years, this is not the site of the actual windmill. The Mayland post-mill, thought to have been built in 1817, was known for many years as Cardnell's Mill, as apparently George Cardnell occupied it from 1863 to 1899.
The site of the windmill was in a field opposite Mill Road, Mayland, therefore further along the Steeple Road and on the opposite side. Although the mill was demolished many years ago, the mill house still remains as a residential property.

The Henry Samuel Hall on Steeple Road, Mayland, has a fascinating history linked to the American philanthropist Joseph Fels and The Back to the Land Movement.  This is still being researched, but it is known the hall was brought to Mayland from a site in Kingsway, London in 1908, arranged by Fel's agricultural smallholdings manager Thomas Smith, to be used as a temporary school for the children of the farmers and agricultural workers.
 
There is also a local paper known as The Maylands Mayl which is a useful source of information for in and around the area.

Parish council
Mayland Parish Council meets monthly at the Lawling Hall, Lawling Park, off Katonia Avenue, Maylansea  The villages of Mayland and Maylandsea are in an area, parts of which are considered to be at risk from flooding, and the Parish Council, working with Maldon District Council, is developing a localised emergency plan to link into the wider emergency strategy covering the whole district.

Local interest
There are always fossils to be found in Maylandsea, the most common being lobster fragments. There is a crashed P51B Mustang from World War II near Lawling Creek.

References

External links

Mayland Parish Council website
The history of Mayland and Maylandsea

Villages in Essex